Ben Healy may refer to:

 Ben Healy (cyclist) (born 2000), Irish cyclist
 Ben Healy (rugby union) (born 1999), Irish rugby union player